The Martin XB-68 was a supersonic medium tactical bomber with a crew of two that was proposed in 1954 to the United States Air Force. The project, however, was canceled before any aircraft were built.

Design and development
The Glenn L. Martin Company submitted design studies in response to the Weapon System 302A requirement in 1952 in competition with proposals from Douglas Aircraft Company and North American Aviation, Inc. Revised designs were presented again in 1954. The Boeing Airplane Company also submitted a design after the competition date had passed and was automatically rejected. The Martin 316 was declared the winner in 1956 and received the designation XB-68. Deployment was projected for the 1962-1965 period.

With a conventional layout that somewhat resembled a scaled-up Lockheed F-104, the XB-68 was to have been primarily of steel construction, with the crew of a pilot-radio operator and navigator-bombardier defense systems operator in a pressurized compartment, to be cooled by filtered bleed-air from the engines, and a refrigeration unit for evaporative cooling at high Mach numbers. The B-68 would have had stubby diamond-shaped wings and a raked T-tail empennage. It was intended to be operated at supersonic speeds at medium and high altitudes.

The design immediately ran into serious difficulties over the inertial guidance bombing and navigation system, which, had the bomber been approved for production, would have pushed deployment back to at least 1963. The problems were rendered moot when Air Force headquarters cancelled the project in 1957, citing stringent budget limitations and higher priorities for other weapon systems. Recognizing that the medium tactical bomber design was still years away, plans were carried forward instead to continue using an Air Force version of the Navy's Douglas A3D, which was designated B-66 Destroyer. Two planned XB-68 prototypes and one static test model were cancelled, and none were built.

Specifications (as designed)

See also

References

External links

 Aerospace Review: Martin XB-68
 Defense Talk: XB-68
 The Unwanted Blog: Martin XB-68, Martin Model 316, Model 302 drawings

Martin aircraft
Twinjets
Cancelled military aircraft projects of the United States